Side Effects is an EP by the Danish singer-songwriters Mads Langer and Tim Christensen, released on July 19, 2014 through RCA and Sony Music Denmark. The EP was awarded the "Danish rock album of the year", while the collaboration garnered the duo a GAFFA Award for "Danish rock band of the year".

Background
Christensen and Langer first met during the 2006 Danish Music Awards. Langer opened for several of Christensen's shows in 2009, and they collaborated on the song "Say No More", which was released on Langer's eponymous album that same year.

In March 2014, it was announced that Langer and Christensen would perform together during the Grøn Koncert tour in July 2014. The EP was created with these performances in mind. After an acoustic set, they were joined on stage by bassist Søren Balsner of Carpark North and drummer Birk Nevel. In addition to the songs from Side Effects, they played songs from the repertoires of both Christensen and Langer.

Langer and Christensen wrote four new songs for the EP, and added a mashup of Langer's 2008 song "Fact-Fiction" and the 1993 hit "Silverflame" by Christensen's band Dizzy Mizz Lizzy, which was first played in the DR3 show DR3 Popper Op on February 16, 2013. "Bringing Back Tomorrow" was released as a single on June 2, followed by "Fact-Fiction / Silverflame".

Track listing

Personnel
Musicians
 Mads Langer – vocals, guitars, keyboards (on tracks 1–4)
 Tim Christensen – vocals, guitars, Mellotron (on track 2), bass (on track 4)
 Søren Balsner – bass (on tracks 1–3), keyboards (on tracks 1–4), programming (on tracks 1–4)
 Bengt Lagerberg – drums (on track 1)
 Birk Nevel – drums (on tracks 2–4)

Production
 Søren Balsner – Record producer (tracks 1–4), engineer (tracks 1–4), mixer (tracks 1–2)
 Mads Langer & Tim Christensen – co-producer (tracks 1–4)
 Søren Mikkelsen – producer (track 5), engineer (track 5), mixer (tracks 3–5)
 Anders Schumann – mastering (tracks 1, 2 and 4, at Studio C4 in Copenhagen)
 Björn Engelmann – mastering (tracks 3 and 5, at Cutting Room in Stockholm)
 Paul Wilson – artwork

References

2014 EPs
Sony Music Denmark albums
Tim Christensen albums